Bert Jerome Harris Jr. (December 9, 1919 – May 19, 2019) was an American politician and farmer in the state of Florida.

Harris was born in Warwick, Georgia and moved to Florida in 1926. He attended the University of Florida, graduating in agriculture. Harris was also a veteran of World War II, serving in the United States Army Air Corps in the Pacific Theater He served in the Florida House of Representatives from 1982 to 1992 for District 76 and 1992 to 1996 for District 77. He was a member of the Democratic Party. Harris lived in Lake Placid, Florida where he was a citrus farmer. He died on May 19, 2019 at the age of 99.

References

1919 births
2019 deaths
Democratic Party members of the Florida House of Representatives
People from Worth County, Georgia
People from Highlands County, Florida
Military personnel from Florida
Military personnel from Georgia (U.S. state)
Farmers from Florida
United States Army personnel of World War II
University of Florida alumni
20th-century American politicians